Cătălin Răducan Necula (born 4 December 1969) is a retired Romanian football player, known for his association with football manager Cosmin Olăroiu, currently working at Al Ahli as assistant manager.

Playing career
Necula, son of the famous Romanian goalkeeper Răducanu Necula, started his career at Sportul Studențesc București in 1988. He spent four seasons at Sportul before switching to Universitatea Cluj in 1993.

In 1995, he joined Naţional București and then in 1998 he played for a short while for Hapoel Kfar Saba in Israel. After he returned to Romania, he continued to play for FCM Reşiţa, Rocar București, Bihor Oradea, Argeş Piteşti and Gloria Bistriţa, before retiring from professional football in 2004.

Necula earned four caps for the Romanian national side in 1993.

Coaching career
In 2004, Necula returned to Naţional București, this time as assistant coach and then in the autumn of 2005 he was for a short while the team's head coach. When Cosmin Olăroiu took over at Steaua București in the winter of 2005 he asked Necula to join him as assistant manager. Since then he joined the coaching staff of Cosmin Olăroiu.

References

External links
 
 
 

1969 births
Living people
Romanian footballers
Romanian expatriate footballers
Romania international footballers
FC Sportul Studențesc București players
FC Universitatea Cluj players
FC Progresul București players
CSM Reșița players
Hapoel Kfar Saba F.C. players
Expatriate footballers in Israel
AFC Rocar București players
FC Bihor Oradea players
FC Argeș Pitești players
Liga I players
FC Steaua București assistant managers
FC Progresul București managers
Association football defenders
Romanian football managers
Al Hilal SFC managers
Saudi Professional League managers
Expatriate football managers in Saudi Arabia
Romanian expatriate sportspeople in Saudi Arabia